Gerald Brown may refer to:

Sports
 Gerald Brown (American football), American football coach
 Gerald Brown (basketball) (born 1975), American basketball player
 Gerry Brown (ice hockey) (1917–1998), Canadian ice hockey player

Others
 Gerald E. Brown (1926–2013), American theoretical physicist
 Gerald Brown (priest) (1935–2002), Archdeacon of Scandinavia and Germany

See also 
 Gerald Browne (disambiguation)
 Jerald Brown (born 1980), American-born Canadian football player
 Gerry Brown (disambiguation)
 Jerry Brown (disambiguation)